The 13th Air Expeditionary Group is a provisional United States Air Force unit.

History

World War II
The group was first activated at Langley Field, Virginia in January 1941 as the 13th Bombardment Group, with the 39th, 40th, and 41st Bombardment Squadrons assigned and the 3d Reconnaissance Squadron attached.  The group was equipped with a mix of Douglas B-18 Bolos and North American B-25 Mitchells.  In June, the group moved to Orlando Army Air Base, Florida.

After the attack on Pearl Harbor, the group was ordered to search for German U-boats off the southeast coast.  Although the Navy was responsible for long range patrolling, it lacked the aircraft to perform the mission and the Army Air Forces (AAF) performed the mission, even though its crews lacked proper training. As antisubmarine warfare assets were realigned to meet the growing threat in the North Atlantic, the 13th Group moved to Westover Field, Massachusetts in January 1942. The following month, the 3d Reconnaissance Squadron was assigned to the group, and, in April, became the 393d Bombardment Squadron.

In October 1942, the AAF organized its antisubmarine forces into the single Army Air Forces Antisubmarine Command, which established the 25th Antisubmarine Wing the following month to control its forces operating over the Atlantic. Its bombardment group headquarters, including the 13th, were inactivated.

Expeditionary operations
The group was converted to provisional status, redesignated the 13th Air Expeditionary Group and assigned to Pacific Air Forces to activate or inactivate as needed.  It has been used primarily to control operations or exercises for Thirteenth Air Force.  This has included acting as the air component of Joint Task Force-Support Forces Antarctica.   The group commander is dual hatted as the deputy commander, JTF-SFA.

Lineage
 Constituted as the 13th Bombardment Group (Medium) on 20 November 1940
 Inactivated on 30 November 1942
 Redesignated 13th Air Expeditionary Group and converted to provisional status
 Activated 2 October 2003
 Inactivated 31 October 2003
 Activated 2 February 2004 for Exercise Balikatan 04
 Inactivated 1 April 2004
 Activated 5 February 2004 for Exercise Cope Tiger 04
 Inactivated 9 March 2004
 Activated 11 January 05 for Exercise Cope Tiger 05
 Inactivated 8 February 2005
 Activated 30 January 2006 for Exercise Cope Tiger 06
 Inactivated c. February 2006
 Activated c. January 2007 for Exercise Cope Tiger 07
 Inactivated 13 February 07
 Activated 10 June 2007 for Exercise Talisman Saber 07
 Inactivated c. June 2007
 Activated 18 August 2007 for Exercise Pacific Airlift Rally 07
 Inactivated 26 August 2007
 Active for Operation Deep Freeze c. 30 November 2007
 Activated 11 January 2008 for Exercise Balikatan 08
 Inactivated 31 March 2008
 Activated 14 January 2008 for Exercise Cope Tiger 08
 Inactivated 13 February 08
 Activated c. March 2009 for Exercise Cope Tiger 09
 Inactivated 3 April 2009
 Activated 1 February 2010 for Exercise Balikatan Sagip 10
 Inactivated 24 February 2010
 Activated 24 February 2010 for Exercise Cope Tiger 10
 Inactivated 16 March 2010
 Active c. 8 November 2010
 Activated 7 March 2012 for Exercise Cope Tiger 11
 Inactivated 4 April 2012
 Activated 9 April 2012 for Exercise Balikatan 2012
 Inactivated 30 April 2012
 Active c. 12 November 2015

Assignments
 First Air Force, 15 January 1941
 I Bomber Command, 6 June 1941
 Army Air Forces Antisubmarine Command, 15 October–November 1942
 Pacific Air Command to activate or inactivate as needed
 Attached to Thirteenth Air Force, 2 October 2003 – 31 October 2003
 Attached to Thirteenth Air Force, 2 February 2004 – 1 April 2004
 Attached to Thirteenth Air Force, 5 February 2004 – 9 March 2004
 Attached to Thirteenth Air Force, 11 January 2005 – 8 February 2005
 13th Air Expeditionary Task Force, 30 January 2006-c. February 2006
 13th Air Expeditionary Task Force, c. January 2007 – 13 February 2007
 Attached to Thirteenth Air Force, 10 June 2007-c. June 2007
 13th Air Expeditionary Task Force, 18 August 2007 – 26 August 2007
 Attached to Thirteenth Air Force, 11 January 2008 – 31 March 2008
 13th Air Expeditionary Wing, 14 January 2008 – 13 February 2008
 Joint Task Force-Support Forces Antarctica c. 30 November 2008
 13th Air Expeditionary Wing, c. March 2009-3 April 2009
 Attached to Thirteenth Air Force, 1 February 2010 – 24 February 2010
 13th Air Expeditionary Wing, 24 February 2010 – 16 March 2010
 Joint Task Force-Support Forces Antarctica c. 8 November 2010
 13th Air Expeditionary Wing, 7 March 2012 – 4 April 2012
 Attached to Thirteenth Air Force, 9 April 2012– 30 April 2012
 Joint Task Force-Support Forces Antarctica c. 12 November 2015

Components
 39th Bombardment Squadron: 15 January 1941 – 30 November 1942
 40th Bombardment Squadron: 15 January 1941 – 30 November 1942
 An air echelon was attached to the: Caribbean Sea Frontier, United States Navy, 30 August – 9 October 1942 and 16 October – 15 November 1942
 An air echelon was attached to the: 99th Bombardment Squadron, 9–16 October 1942
 41st Bombardment Squadron: 15 January 1941 – 30 November 1942
 3d Reconnaissance Squadron (later 393d Bombardment Squadron): attached 15 January 1941 – 25 February 1942, assigned 25 February – 30 November 1942
 304th Expeditionary Airlift Squadron, c. 30 November 2007
 139th Expeditionary Airlift Squadron, c. 30 November 2007

Stations
 Langley Field, Virginia, 15 January 1941
 Orlando Army Air Base, Florida, c. 6 June 1941
 Westover Field, Massachusetts, 20 January – 30 November 1942
 Andersen Air Force Base, Guam, 2 October 2003 – 31 October 2003
 Clark Field, Philippines, 2 February 2004 – 1 April 2004
 Korat Royal Thai Air Force Base, Thailand, 5 February 2004 – 9 March 2004
 Korat Royal Thai Air Force Base, Thailand, 11 January 2005 – 8 February 2005
 Korat Royal Thai Air Force Base, Thailand, 30 January 2006-c. February 2006
 Korat Royal Thai Air Force Base, Thailand, c. January 2007 – 13 February 2007
 Brisbane International Airport, Australia, 10 June 2007-c. June 2007
 Halim Air Base, Indonesia, 18 August 2007 – 26 August 2007
 Clark International Airport, Philippines, 11 January 2008 – 31 March 2008
 Udon Thani Thailand, 14 January 2008 – 13 February 2008
 Korat Royal Thai Air Force Base, Thailand, c. March 2009-3 April 2009
 Diosdado Macapagal International Airport, Philippines, 1 February 2010 – 24 February 2010
 Udon Thani Thailand, 24 February 2010 – 16 March 2010
 Udon Thani Thailand, 7 March 2012 – 4 April 2012
 Clark Field, Philippines, 9 April 12–30 April 12

References

Notes

Bibliography

 
 
 

013